Gastrointestinal Endoscopy is a monthly peer-reviewed medical journal covering gastroenterology, especially as relating to endoscopy. It is published by Elsevier and the official publication of the American Society for Gastrointestinal Endoscopy. The editor-in-chief is Michael B. Wallace (Mayo Clinic).

History 
The journal was established as the Bulletin of the American Gastroscopic Society, was continued as the Bulletin of Gastroscopy and Esophagoscopy from 1959 to 1961, then as the Bulletin of Gastrointestinal Endoscopy until 1965 when it obtained its current name.

Abstracting and indexing 
The journal is abstracted and indexed in Index Medicus/MEDLINE/PubMed, Current Contents/Clinical Medicine, Current Contents/Life Sciences, Science Citation Index, Embase, and Scopus. According to the Journal Citation Reports, the journal has a 2014 impact factor of 5.369.

References

External links 
 

Gastroenterology and hepatology journals
Monthly journals
Publications established in 1954
English-language journals
Elsevier academic journals
Academic journals associated with learned and professional societies